The 1985 Maybelline Classic was a women's tennis tournament played on outdoor hard courts at the Bonaventure Racquet Club in Fort Lauderdale, Florida in the United States that was part of the 1985 Virginia Slims World Championship Series. It was the sixth and last edition of the tournament and was held from September 30 through October 6, 1985. First-seeded Martina Navratilova won her second consecutive singles title at the event.

Finals

Singles
 Martina Navratilova defeated  Steffi Graf 6–3, 6–1
 It was Navratilova's 9th singles title of the year and the 108th of her career.

Doubles
 Gigi Fernández /  Robin White defeated  Rosalyn Fairbank /  Beverly Mould 6–2, 7–5
 It was Fernández' 4th doubles title of the year and of her career. It was White's 2nd doubles title of the year and of her career.

References

External links
 ITF tournament edition details

Maybelline Classic
Maybelline Classic
Maybelline Classic
Maybelline Classic
Maybelline Classic
Maybelline Classic